Aerolíneas Argentinas was formed by the Argentine's Ministry of Transport as a state corporation in , when it took over the routes and assets of four struggling airlines. A year and a half later, in late , the company introduced the Buenos Aires–Rio de Janeiro–Natal–Dakar–Lisbon–Paris–Frankfurt route, using 48-seater DC-6 equipment, linking Argentina with Germany for the first time since 1933. Upon taking delivery of the first three Comet 4s, which also became the first jetliners in the airline's fleet, these brand new aircraft were deployed on the Buenos Aires–London, Buenos Aires–New York City, and Buenos Aires–Santiago de Chile routes.

, the airline's top five international routes in terms of available seat kilometre (ASK) were Buenos Aires-Ezeiza–Madrid-Barajas, Buenos Aires-Ezeiza–Miami, Buenos Aires-Ezeiza–Barcelona, Buenos Aires-Ezeiza–Rome-Fiumicino and Buenos Aires-Ezeiza–Sydney; European routes account for about 41% of total ASK. In , the airline was granted permission to operate services to Atlanta, Detroit, Guangzhou, Las Vegas and Tel Aviv, yet it was announced it will not fly to these destinations with its own aircraft in the near future. , the airline top five domestic airports by available seats are Aeroparque Jorge Newbery, Ingeniero Aeronáutico Ambrosio L.V. Taravella International Airport, Ministro Pistarini International Airport, San Carlos de Bariloche Airport and Comandante Armando Tola International Airport.

List

Following is a list of destinations the airline flies to, . Destinations in the list below are presented by country, and for each of them the cities served are provided, along with the airport served. The list also includes airports that serve either as a hub or as a focus city for the airline, as well as destinations served on a seasonal basis. Terminated destinations are also listed, yet for Aerolíneas Argentinas only.

See also

Notes

References

External links 

Lists of airline destinations
Aerolíneas Argentinas
SkyTeam destinations